Hudswell may refer to:

 Hudswell, North Yorkshire, England
 Hudswell, Wiltshire, England